There are around 170 species of reptiles living in Pakistan.

Order Crocodilia

There are only two species endemic to Pakistan.

 Family Crocodylidae (crocodiles) - 1 species
 Crocodylus palustris (mugger crocodile, Indian crocodile, Indus crocodile or marsh crocodile) - national reptile
 Family Gavialidae (gharials) - 1 species
 Gavialis gangeticus (Indian gavial or gharial)

Order Squamata
Around 153 species of Squamata are found in Pakistan.

Suborder Lacertilia

There are 86 species of Lacertilia (lizards and relatives) in Pakistan.

 Family Agamidae (agamas) - 22 species
 Brachysaura minor (Hardwicke's bloodsucker)
 Calotes versicolor (Oriental garden lizard, eastern garden lizard or changeable lizard)
 Japalura kumaonensis (Kumaon mountain lizard)
 Paralaudakia badakhshana (Badakhshana rock agama)
 Paralaudakia caucasia (Caucasian agama)
 Paralaudakia himalayana (Himalayan agama)
 Laudakia agrorensis (Agror agama)
 Laudakia melanura (black agama)
 Laudakia fusca (yellow-headed rock agama)
 Laudakia nupta (large-scaled rock agama) - 2 subspecies
 Laudakia n. fusca
 Laudakia n. nupta
 Laudakia tuberculata (Kashmir rock agama)
 Phrynocephalus clarkorum (Clark's toad-headed agama)
 Phrynocephalus euptilopus (Alcock's toad-headed agama)
 Phrynocephalus luteoguttatus (yellow-speckled toad-headed agama)
 Phrynocephalus maculatus (blacktail toadhead agama)
 Phrynocephalus ornatus (ornate toadhead agama)
 Phrynocephalus scutellatus (gray toadhead agama)
 Trapelus agilis pakistanensis (brilliant ground agama)
 Trapelus rubrigularis (red-throated agama)
 Trapelus ruderatus (horn-scaled agama or Baluch ground agama)
 Uromastyx asmussi (Iranian mastigure)
 Uromastyx hardwickii (Hardwick's spiny-tailed lizard or Indian spiny-tailed lizard)
 Family Chamaeleonidae (chameleons) - 1 species
 Chamaeleo zeylanicus (Indian chameleon or Ceylon chameleon)
 Family Gekkonidae (eyelid and lidless geckoes) - 33 species
 Agamura femoralis or Rhinogecko femoralis (De Witte's gecko or sharp-tailed spider gecko)
 Agamura persica persica (Persian spider gecko)
 Bunopus tuberculatus (Baluch rock gecko)
 Crossobamon eversmanni (Baluchistan sand gecko or comb-toed gecko) - 2 subspecies
 Crossobamon e. eversmanni or Crossobamon maynardi
 Crossobamon e. lumsdenii
 Crossobamon orientalis (Sind gecko)
 Cyrtodactylus walli (Chitral gecko or Swat stone gecko)
 Cyrtopodium agamuroides (Nikolsky spider gecko)
 Cyrtopodium baturensis (Batura thin-toed gecko or Batura gecko)
 Cyrtopodium dattanensis (Khan's bow-fingered gecko or Hazara gecko)
 Cyrtopodium fortmunroi (Fort Munro gecko)
 Cyrtopodium indusoani (Soan Sakaser gecko)
 Cyrtopodium kachhensis (Kutch gecko) - 2 subspecies
 Cyrtopodium k. ingoldbyi (Ingoldby's stone gecko)
 Cyrtopodium k. kachhensis (warty rock gecko)
 Cyrtopodium mintoni (Minton's gecko)
 Cyrtopodium montiumsalsorum (Salt Range rock gecko)
 Cyrtopodium rhodocaudus (red-tailed gecko)
 Cyrtopodium rohtasfortai (Rohtas Fort gecko)
 Cyrtopodium scaber (keeled rock gecko)
 Cyrtopodium watsoni (Quetta rock gecko)
 Eublepharis macularius (leopard gecko)
 Hemidactylus brookii brookii (Brook's house gecko or spotted Indian house gecko)
 Hemidactylus flaviviridis (yellow-bellied house gecko)
 Hemidactylus frenatus (Pacific house gecko or South Asian waif gecko)
 Hemidactylus imbricatus (carrot-tail viper gecko)
 Hemidactylus leschenaultii (Leschenault's leaf-toed gecko or bark gecko)
 Hemidactylus persicus (Persian leaf-toed gecko)
 Hemidactylus triedrus triedus (termite hill gecko or blotched house gecko)
 Hemidactylus turcicus turcicus (Mediterranean house gecko)
 Microgecko depressus (low lying gecko)
 Microgecko helenae (banded dwarf gecko)
 Ptyodactylus homolepis (Pakistan fan-fingered gecko) - 2 subspecies
 Ptyodactylus h. homolepis
 Ptyodactylus h. socotranus
 Teratoscincus microlepis (small-scaled wonder gecko or Baluch plate-tailed gecko)
 Teratoscincus scincus (Turkestan plate-tailed gecko or common wonder gecko or frog-eyed gecko)
 Tropiocolotes persica (Persian sand gecko or Persian pygmy gecko)
 Family Lacertidae (sand lizards, wall lizards and true lizards) - 12 species
 Acanthodactylus cantoris (Indian fringe-fingered lizard) - 2 subspecies
 Acanthodactylus c. blanfordii (Mekran fringe-fingered lizard)
 Acanthodactylus c. cantoris (Indian fringe-fingered lizard)
 Acanthodactylus micropholis (yellow-tailed sand lizard)
 Eremias acutirostris (reticulate desert lacerta)
 Eremias fasciata (yellow-headed desert lacerta)
 Eremias scripta (Caspian desert lacerta)
 Eremias velox persica (Persian Steppe lacerta)
 Mesalina brevirostris (short-nosed desert lacerta)
 Mesalina guttulata (small-spotted lizard or long-tailed desert lacerta)
 Ophisops elegans (elegant snake-eyed lizard) - 2 subspecies
 Ophisops e. blanfordi (Blanfords snake-eyed lizard)
 Ophisops e. elegans (elegant snake-eyed lizard)
 Ophisops jerdonii (Jerdon's snake-eyed lizard or Punjab snake-eyed lizard)
 Ophisops microlepis (Indian snake-eyed lizard)
 Scapteira aporosceles (Chagai desert lacerta)
 Family Scincidae (skinks) - 15 species
 Ablepharus grayanus (minor snake-eyed skink)
 Ablepharus pannonicus (Asian snake-eyed skink)
 Chalcides ocellatus (ocellated skink)
 Eumeces schneiderii zarudnyi (Schneider's skink, Berber skink or Zarudny's skink)
 Eurylepis indothalensis (Thal skink)
 Eurylepis taeniolata (alpine Punjab skink or yellow-bellied mole skink)
 Eutropis dissimilis (striped grass mabuya or striped grass skink)
 Eutropis macularia (bronze mabuya, bronze grass skink)
 Ophiomorus blanfordii (Makran sand swimmer)
 Ophiomorus brevipes (short-toed sand swimmer)
 Ophiomorus raithmai (Indus sand swimmer)
 Ophiomorus tridactylus (three-toed snake skink or Indian sandswimmer)
 Scincella ladacensis - 2 subspecies
 Scincella l. ladacensis (Ladak ground skink)
 Scincella l. himalayana (Himalayan ground skink)
 Family Varanidae (monitor lizards) - 3 species
Varanus bengalensis (Bengal monitor)
Varanus flavescens (yellow monitor)
Varanus griseus - 2 subspecies
 Varanus g. caspius (eastern desert monitor)
 Varanus g. koniecznyi (Thar desert monitor)

Suborder Serpentes

There are 70 species and 24 subspecies of Serpentes (snakes) found in Pakistan.
 Family Boidae (boas) - 3 species
Eryx johnii (Indian sand boa or red sand boa)
 Eryx tataricus speciosus (Tartar sand boa)
Eryx conicus (rough-scaled sand boa)
 Family Colubridae (colubrids) - 35 species
 Herpetoreas platyceps
 Herpetoreas sieboldii
 Dendrelaphis tristis 
 Coelognathus helena 
Amphiesma stolata stolata
 Boiga trigonata – 2 subspecies
 Boiga t. melanocephala
 Boiga t. trigonata
 Coluber fasciolatus
 Coluber karelini – 2 subspecies
 Coluber k. karelini
 Coluber k. mintonorum
 Coluber ravergeiri ravergeiri
 Coluber rhodorachis – 3 subspecies
 Coluber r. kashmirensis
 Coluber r. ladacensis
 Coluber r. rhodorachis
 Coluber ventromaculatus – 3 subspecies
 Coluber v. bengalensis
 Coluber v. indusai
 Coluber v. ventromaculatus
 Enhydris pakistanica
 Fowlea piscator 
 Fowlea sanctijohannis
 Fowlea schnurrenbergeri
 Lycodon aulicus 
 Lycodon mackinnoni
 Lycodon striatus – 2 subspecies
 Lycodon s. bicolor
 Lycodon s. striatus
 Lycodon travancoricus
 Lytorhynchus maynardi
 Lytorhynchus paradoxus
 Lytorhynchus ridgewayi
 Natrix tessellata 
 Oligodon russelius
 Oligodon taeniolatus
 Psammophis condanarus 
 Psammophis leithii
 Psammophis lineolatus
 Psammophis schokari
 Pseudocyclophis persica
 Ptyas mucosus
 Sibynophis sagittarius
 Spalerosophis arenarius
 Spalerosophis diadema – 2 subspecies
 Spalerosophis d. diadema
 Spalerosophis d. schirazianus
 Telescopus rhinopoma
 Xenochrophis cerasogaster
 Family Elapidae (kraits and cobras) - 4 species
 Bungarus caeruleus (common krait)
 Bungarus sindanus (Sind krait) – 2 subspecies
 Bungarus s. razai (northern Punjab krait)
 Bungarus s. sindanus (Sind krait)
 Naja naja (Indian cobra or spectacled cobra)
 Naja oxiana (Central Asian cobra or oxus cobra)
 Family Hydrophiidae (sea snakes) - 14 species
 Astrotia stokesii (Stokes' sea snake)
 Enhydrina schistosa (beaked sea snake, hook-nosed sea snake, common sea snake or Valakadyn sea snake)
 Hydrophis caerulescens (dwarf seasnake or many-toothed sea snake)
 Hydrophis cyanocinctus (annulated sea snake or blue-banded sea snake)
 Hydrophis fasciatus (striped sea snake)
 Hydrophis lapemoides (Persian Gulf sea snake)
 Hydrophis mamillaris (Bombay sea snake)
 Hydrophis ornatus (ornate reef seasnake)
 Hydrophis spiralis (Yellow Sea snake)
 Lapemis curtus (Shaw's sea snake)
 Microcephalophis cantoris (Cantor's small-headed sea snake)
 Microcephalophis gracilis (graceful small-headed sea snake or slender sea snake)
 Pelamis platurus (yellow-bellied sea snake or pelagic sea snake)
 Praescutata viperina (viperine sea snake)
 Family Leptotyphlopidae (thread snakes) - 2 species
 Leptotyphlops blanfordii (Blanford's worm snake or Sind thread snake)
 Leptotyphlops macrorhynchus (long-nosed worm snake or beaked thread snake)
 Family Pythonidae (pythons) - 1 species
 Python molurus molurus (Indian python, black-tailed python or Sind python)
 Family Typhlopidae (blind snakes) - 4 species
 Ramphotyphlops braminus (brahminy blind snake)
 Typhlops ahsanai (Ahsan's blind snake)
 Typhlops porrectus or Typhlops ductuliformes (slender worm snake)
 Typhlops madgemintonai – 2 subspecies
 Typhlops m. madgemintonai (Madge's blind snake)
 Typhlops m. shermanai (Sherman's blind snake)
 Family Viperidae (vipers and pit vipers) - 7 species
 Daboia russelii russelii (daboia or Russell's viper)
 Echis carinatus (Indian saw-scaled viper) - 3 subspecies
 Echis c. astolae (Astola saw-scaled viper)
 Echis c. multisquamatus (multiscale saw-scaled viper)
 Echis c. sochureki (Sochurek's saw-scaled viper)
 Echis pyramidum (northeast African carpet viper, Egyptian saw-scaled viper)
 Eristicophis macmahonii (McMahon's viper, Asian sand viper, leaf-nosed viper)
 Gloydius himalayanus (Himalayan pit viper)
 Macrovipera lebetinus (blunt-nosed viper, Lebetine viper, Levant viper) - 3 subspecies
 Macrovipera lebetina obtusa  (west-Asian blunt-nosed viper, Levant blunt-nosed viper)
 Macrovipera lebetina cernovi (Chernov blunt-nosed viper)
 Macrovipera lebetina turanica (Turan blunt-nosed viper)
 Pseudocerastes persicus persicus (Persian horned viper, false horned viper)

Order Testudines

There are 15 species of testudines that represent Pakistan.

 Family Cheloniidae (sea turtles) - 4 species
 Chelonia mydas (green sea turtle)
 Caretta caretta (loggerhead sea turtle)
 Eretmochelys imbricata bissa (hawksbill turtle)
 Lepidochelys olivacea (olive ridley turtle)
 Family Dermochelyidae (softshell sea turtles) - 1 species
 Dermochelys coriacea (leatherback sea turtle or leatherback)
 Family Geoemydidae (Asian river turtles, Asian leaf turtles, Asian box turtles and roofed turtles) - 4 species
 Geoclemys hamiltonii (black pond turtle, spotted pond turtle or Indian spotted turtle)
 Hardella thurjii (brahminy river turtle or crowned river turtle)
 Kachuga smithii smithii (brown-roofed turtle)
 Kachuga tecta (Indian roofed turtle)
 Melanochelys trijuga (Indian black turtle)
 Family Testudinidae (true tortoises) - 2 species
 Geochelone elegans (Indian star tortoise)
 Testudo horsfieldi horsfieldii (Afghan tortoise, Horsfield's tortoise or Central Asian tortoise)
 Family Trionychidae (softshell turtles) - 4 species
 Aspideretes gangeticus indica (Ganges soft-shelled turtle)
 Aspideretes hurum (peacock soft-shelled turtle)
 Chitra indica (narrow-headed soft-shelled turtle)
 Lissemys punctata andersoni (Indian flap-shelled turtle)

References
 Khan, M. Z., Amtyaz Safi., Fatima. F., Hashmi, M. U. A., Hussain, B. Siddiqui, S., Khan, S. I. & Ghalib, S. A. (2015). "An evaluation of distribution, status and abundance of freshwater turtles in the selected areas of Sindh and Khyber Pakhtunkhwa provinces of Pakistan". Canadian Journal of Pure & Applied Sciences. 9 (1): 3201-3219.
 Safi A, Khan M. Z. (2014). "Distribution and current population status of freshwater turtles of District Charsadda of Khyber Pakhtunkhwa, Pakistan". The Journal of Zoology Studies. 1 (4): 31-38.
 Hashmi, M. U. A, Khan, M. Z, Safi, A., Huda, N. (2013). "Current Status, Distribution and threats of Varanus Spp. (Varanus bengalensis & Veranus griseus) in Karachi & Thatta of Sindh". International Journal of Fauna and Biological Studies. 1 (1): 34–38.

External links
 Wildlife of Pakistan - Biodiversity
 Wildlife of Pakistan - List of Reptiles
 Snakes of Pakistan with names and descriptions 

 
Reptiles
Pakistan
Pakistan